Panmovriakos Football Club is a Greek football club, based in Riolos, Achaea, Greece.

Honours

Domestic

 Achaea FCA champion: 1
 2017–18

References

Football clubs in Western Greece
Achaea
Association football clubs established in 1975
1975 establishments in Greece
Gamma Ethniki clubs